Mrs. Temple's Telegram is a 1920 American silent comedy film directed by James Cruze and starring Bryant Washburn and Wanda Hawley. It is based on the 1905 Broadway play Mrs. Temple's Telegram by Frank Wyatt. It was produced by Famous Players-Lasky and released through Paramount Pictures.

This film survives and is preserved at the Library of Congress and at Gosfilmofond, Moscow.

Plot
As described in a film magazine, Jack Temple (Washburn) adores his wife, but Mrs. Clara Temple (Hawley) is extremely jealous, and accuses him of flirting with a pretty woman in a department store tea room. After his wife's departure, the woman in question follows Jack around the store and even onto the roof of the building, where he was trying to hide. They are locked in there by the night watchman and have to remain on the roof all night. Jack realizes his wife will never believe this story, so he invents a yarn about visiting his friend John Brown (White) in a distant town. Clara suspects that he is not telling the truth and sends a telegram to Brown, while Jack convinces a friend to impersonate Brown and come to his house. Receiving the telegram, Brown goes to the Temple home. Things become complicated with the arrival of Mrs. Brown (Schaefer), the pretty young woman who caused all the trouble, but, after she introduces herself as one of Clara's cousins, all ends happily.

Cast
Bryant Washburn as Jack Temple
Wanda Hawley as Mrs. Clara Temple
Carmen Phillips as Pauline
Walter Hiers as Frank Fuller
Sylvia Ashton as Mrs. Fuller
Leo White as John Brown
Anne Schaefer as Mrs. Brown
Edward Jobson as Wigson

See also 
 The Six Best Cellars
 The Gypsy Trail
 Too Much Wife

References

External links

Wanda and Bryant in a scene from the film (University of Washington, Sayre collection)

1920 films
American silent feature films
Films directed by James Cruze
American films based on plays
Paramount Pictures films
1920 comedy films
Silent American comedy films
American black-and-white films
1920s American films